Bad Men of Thunder Gap is a 1943 American Western film directed by Albert Herman and written by Elmer Clifton. The film stars Dave O'Brien, James Newill, Guy Wilkerson, Janet Shaw, Jack Ingram and Charles King. The film was released on March 5, 1943, by Producers Releasing Corporation.

In the film, Newill sings Carl Shrum's "Ride, Ride, Ride" and Tex Coe's "West Winds".

Plot
Tex Wyatt is unfairly accused of murder, but escapes to join his ranger colleagues Jim Steele and Panhandle Perkins to track down the real criminals.

Cast          
Dave O'Brien as Tex Wyatt
James Newill as Jim Steele 
Guy Wilkerson as Panhandle Perkins
Janet Shaw as Martha Stewart
Jack Ingram as Ed Ransom 
Charles King as Pete Holman
Michael Vallon as John Hobbs
Lucille Vance as Matilda Matthews
Tom London as Hank Turner
I. Stanford Jolley as Bill Horne
Bud Osborne as Clem
Jimmy Aubrey as Frank Rand
Cal Shrum as Accordion Player
Robert Hoag as Fiddle Player
Don Weston as Guitar Player

See also
The Texas Rangers series:
 The Rangers Take Over (1942)
 Bad Men of Thunder Gap (1943)
 West of Texas (1943)
 Border Buckaroos (1943)
 Fighting Valley (1943)
 Trail of Terror (1943)
 The Return of the Rangers (1943)
 Boss of Rawhide (1943)
 Outlaw Roundup (1944)
 Guns of the Law (1944)
 The Pinto Bandit (1944)
 Spook Town (1944)
 Brand of the Devil (1944)
 Gunsmoke Mesa (1944)
 Gangsters of the Frontier (1944)
 Dead or Alive (1944)
 The Whispering Skull (1944)
 Marked for Murder (1945)
 Enemy of the Law (1945)
 Three in the Saddle (1945)
 Frontier Fugitives (1945)
 Flaming Bullets (1945)

References

External links
 

1943 films
American Western (genre) films
1943 Western (genre) films
Producers Releasing Corporation films
Films directed by Albert Herman
American black-and-white films
1940s English-language films
1940s American films